Attorney General Castle may refer to:

Latham Castle (1900–1986), Attorney General of Illinois
William Richards Castle (1849–1935), Attorney General of the Kingdom of Hawaii

See also
General Castle (disambiguation)